Anthony Henri Zué Oyono Omva Torque (born 12 April 2001) is a professional footballer who plays as a defender for Serie B club Frosinone. Born in France, he represents Gabon at international level.

Club career 
Having joined US Boulogne in 2018, Oyono was promoted to the first team in July 2020, making his senior debut for the club on the 21 August 2020, starting as a right-back in a 1–0 away win against US Quevilly-Rouen in the Championnat National. In October, he signed a three-year contract extension with the club.

On 30 January 2022, Oyono signed a contract with Italian club Frosinone until 30 June 2024.

International career 
Oyono made his international senior debut with Gabon on the 30 March 2021, starting as a left-back in a 2–0 win against Angola in the 2021 Africa Cup of Nations qualification.

References

External links
 

2001 births
Living people
Footballers from Lille
People with acquired Gabonese citizenship
Gabon international footballers
Gabonese footballers
French footballers
French sportspeople of Gabonese descent
Association football defenders
US Boulogne players
Frosinone Calcio players
Championnat National players
Championnat National 2 players
Serie B players
2021 Africa Cup of Nations players
Gabonese expatriate footballers
Expatriate footballers in Italy
Gabonese expatriate sportspeople in Italy